The ICC Cricket World Cup Trophy is presented to the winners of the Cricket World Cup. The current trophy was created for the 1999 championships, and was the first permanent prize in the tournament's history; prior to this, different trophies were made for each World Cup. The trophy was designed by Paul Marsden of Garrard & co and produced in London by a team of craftsmen from Garrard & Co over a period of two months. The trophy is now manufactured by Ottewill Silversmiths in Ashford.

The current trophy is made from silver and gold and features a golden globe held up by three silver columns. The columns, shaped as stumps and bails, represent the three fundamental aspects of cricket: batting, bowling and fielding, while the globe characterises a cricket ball. It stands 60 cm high and weighs approximately 11.0567 kilograms. The names of the previous winners are engraved on the base of the trophy, with space for a total of twenty inscriptions.

The original trophy is kept by the ICC. A replica which only differs in inscriptions is permanently awarded to the winning team.

History

The Prudential Cups trophy were awarded to the winners of the World Cup from 1975 to 1983 when Prudential plc was the primary sponsor. The trophies' designs changed when the sponsors changed until the 1999 World Cup. So the first three world cups had a similar trophy while 1987 (Reliance World Cup sponsored by Reliance Industries), 1992 (Benson and Hedges Cup, sponsored by Benson and Hedges), and 1996 (Wills World Cup, sponsored by Wills, an ITC brand) had different trophies because of different sponsors until the International Cricket Council decided to award its own trophy.

The current trophy was created for the 1999 championships and is the first permanent prize in the tournament's history. The trophy was designed and produced in London by a team of craftsmen from Garrard & Co (the Crown Jewellers). The whole process was completed over a period of two months time.

ICC Cricket World Cup Trophy

The ICC Cricket World Cup Trophy is presented to the winning team of the ICC Cricket World Cup.
The current trophy is 60 cm high, is made from silver and gold, and features a golden globe held up by three silver columns. The columns, shaped as stumps and bails, represent the three fundamental aspects of cricket: batting, bowling and fielding, while the globe characterises a cricket ball, with the seam that is tilted to represent Axial tilt of the Earth. It is designed with platonic dimensions, so that it can be easily recognised from any angle. The trophy weighs approximately 11 kilograms and has the names of the previous winners inscribed on its base. There is still room for another ten teams to have their name inscribed:

The Reliance World Cup and Wills World Cup were crafted by Amit Pabuwal of Jaipur who has also made the world's largest gold trophy, the most expensive trophy in world history, as well as the T20 World Cup.

Status
The actual trophy is kept by the International Cricket Council in its offices in Dubai but a replica, which is identical in all aspects apart from the inscription of the previous champions, is awarded to the winning team and remains in their possession.

Trophy Winners

References

Trophy
Awards established in 1999
Gold objects